Fall River Heritage State Park is a history-themed public recreation area on the Taunton River in Fall River, Massachusetts. The state park encompasses  beside the Charles M. Braga Jr. Memorial Bridge on Battleship Cove, home of the World War II battleship USS Massachusetts. The park is managed by the Massachusetts Department of Conservation and Recreation.

Park history

The development of the state's heritage parks program began with the allocation of $35 million in 1978 for the creation of eight urban parks throughout Massachusetts. The program's aim was to create quality urban space, celebrate the communities' cultural heritage, and stimulate private economic investment. The visitors center at Fall River Heritage State Park opened to the public in 1985.

Activities and amenities
In addition to its visitors center, the park offers a wheelchair-accessible boardwalk, a  meadow used for picnicking, concerts, and arts & crafts fairs, an antique carousel relocated from Dartmouth's Lincoln Park, and a public sailing program.

In 2018 the park's summer schedule included outdoor rock concerts, a Southeast Asian Cultural Festival, outdoor movies, and a free performance of Shakespeare.

References

External links

Fall River Heritage State Park Department of Conservation and Recreation

State parks of Massachusetts
Parks in Bristol County, Massachusetts
Fall River, Massachusetts
Tourist attractions in Fall River, Massachusetts
1985 establishments in Massachusetts
Protected areas established in 1985